152-mm gun model 1910/30 was a Soviet gun, a modernization of World War I era 152-mm siege gun M1910. The gun was briefly used by RKKA in the German-Soviet War.

Description
M1910/30 was powerful long range gun with big (40°) maximum elevation. It was equipped with interrupted screw breechblock and recoil system consisting of hydraulic buffer and hydro-pneumatic recuperator. The carriage was of single trail type and had metal wheels with solid tires. The crew was protected by 7 mm shield.

In transportation, the barrel was removed and transported separately. It took some 10–15 minutes to set the gun up for combat and up to 23 minutes to make it ready for transportation.

Development and production history
The gun resulted from a modernization of the 152-mm siege gun M1910, initially developed by Schneider. The upgrading project was prepared by the design bureau of the Main Artillery Directorate, its main purpose was to increase range. The changes included:
Lengthened chamber
Mounting of muzzle brake
Reduced (from 1,000 mm to 950 mm) recoil distance
The trail was lengthened (to 2 m)
Trunnion rings were moved 50 mm forward
In 1930 the modernized gun was adopted as 152-mm gun model 1910/30.

The production began in 1930 at Krasniy Putilovets plant. Later Barrikady and Bolshevik plants joined the production effort. In addition to newly built pieces, all existing M1910 guns were converted to the new standard; the conversion was finished by 1 November 1936.

Since the upgrade of 1930 didn't address a problem of limited mobility, in 1934 additional modernization was performed, resulting in 152-mm gun M1910/34. In 1935 the production of M1910/30 was stopped.

Organization and service
According to RKKA organization, 152-mm guns were employed by corps artillery and by the Reserve of the Main Command, typically instead of 152-mm gun-howitzer M1937 (ML-20). Heavy gun regiments of Reserve of the Main Command had 24 pieces each.

By the outbreak of the German-Soviet War RKKA possessed some 120-150 M1910/30s. They undoubtfully saw combat in the war, though due to their limited number the details of their service are unknown.

One piece was captured by the Finnish Army. That gun is currently on display in Hämeenlinna The Artillery Museum of Finland.  The Germans assigned the M1910/30 the designation 15.2cm K 438(r).

Summary
The M1910/30 was a result of limited modernization of World War I era weapon, which didn't address its insufficient mobility (due to lack of suspension and separate transportation of barrel) and limited traverse.

On the other hand, RKKA liked the ballistic characteristics of the gun. Subsequent modernizations, which concentrated mostly on the gun carriage, resulted in improved M1910/34 and eventually in the famous ML-20.

Ammunition

Notes

References
Shirokorad A. B. - Encyclopedia of the Soviet Artillery - Mn. Harvest, 2000 (Широкорад А. Б. Энциклопедия отечественной артиллерии. — Мн.: Харвест, 2000.)
Ivanov A. - Artillery of the USSR in Second World War - SPb Neva, 2003 (Иванов А. Артиллерия СССР во Второй Мировой войне. — СПб., Издательский дом Нева, 2003.)
Shunkov V. N. - The Weapons of the Red Army - Mn. Harvest, 1999 (Шунков В. Н. - Оружие Красной Армии. — Мн.: Харвест, 1999.)

World War II field artillery
World War II artillery of the Soviet Union
152 mm artillery
Kirov Plant products
Military equipment introduced in the 1930s